George Lawson may refer to:

 George Lawson (English MP) (1493–1543), English Member of Parliament
 George Lawson (clergyman) (1598–1678), English divine and writer
 George Lawson (botanist) (1827–1895), Canadian botanist
 George Anderson Lawson (1832–1904), British sculptor
 George Mervyn Lawson (1865–1945), South African clergyman
 George Lawson (Australian politician) (1880–1966), Australian politician
 George Lawson (RAF officer) (1899–1922), South African World War I flying ace
 George Lawson (British politician) (1906–1978), Scottish Member of Parliament, 1954–1974
 George Lawson, American singer from the vocal group Deep River Boys
 George "Yorkey" Lawson, Yorkshire-born fisherman and namesake of Yorkeys Knob, Queensland, Australia